The 2018 NCAA Division I softball tournament was held from May 18 through June 6, 2018 as the final part of the 2018 NCAA Division I softball season. Thirty-two teams were awarded automatic bids as champions of their conferences, and the remaining 32 were selected at-large by the NCAA Division I softball selection committee. The tournament culminated with eight teams playing in the 2018 Women's College World Series at ASA Hall of Fame Stadium in Oklahoma City. This was the first year since the 2010 Women's College World Series that neither the Florida Gators nor the Oklahoma Sooners made the Championship Series. The Florida State Seminoles played in their first Women's College World Series Championship Series and became the first ACC team to make the Championship Series. The Washington Huskies made their fourth appearance in the Championship Series.

Automatic bids
The Big West, Mountain West, Pac-12, and West Coast Conference bids were awarded to the regular-season champion. All other conferences have the automatic bid go to the conference tournament winner.

National seeds
16 National Seeds were announced on the Selection Show Sunday, May 13 at 10 p.m. EDT on ESPN2. The 16 national seeds host the Regionals. Teams in italics advanced to Super Regionals. Teams in bold advance to Women's College World Series.

1.  (47–7)

2.  (50–8)

3.  (50–4)

4.  (50–3)

5.  (44–8)

6. Florida State (47–10)

7.  (43–11)

8.  (43–11)

9.  (45–14)

10.  (45–12)

11.  (41–14)

12. Alabama (33–18)

13.  (39–15)

14.  (40–14)

15.  (40–16)

16.  (31–19)

Regionals and Super Regionals
The Regionals took place May 17–20, 2018. One regional- Eugene, Oregon, took place May 17–19, 2018, because of BYU's no-Sunday-play policy; all other regionals occurred May 18–20, 2018. The Super Regionals took place from May 24–27, 2018.

Eugene Super Regional

Tempe Super Regional

Seattle Super Regional

Norman Super Regional

Los Angeles Super Regional

Tallahassee Super Regional

Athens Super Regional

Gainesville Super Regional

Women's College World Series
The Women's College World Series was held May 31 through June 6, 2018, in Oklahoma City.

Participants 

† = From NCAA Division I Softball Championship Results

Bracket

All-tournament Team
The following players were members of the Women's College World Series All-Tournament Team.

Championship Game

Schedule

Record by conference

The columns RF, SR, WS, NS, F, and NC respectively stand for the Regional Finals, Super Regionals, College World Series Teams, National Semi-Finals, Finals, and National Champion.

Media coverage

Radio
Westwood One provided nationwide radio coverage of the championship series. It was streamed online at westwoodsports.com, through TuneIn, and on SiriusXM. John Sadak made his softball radio debut and joined returning analyst Leah Amico for Westwood One.

Television
ESPN holds exclusive rights to the tournament. They aired games across ESPN, ESPN2, ESPNU, SEC Network, and ESPN3. For the second time in the history of the women's softball tournament ESPN covered every regional.

Broadcast assignments

Regionals
Eugene: Ted Enberg & Kenzie Fowler
Lexington: Courtney Lyle & Jenny Dalton-Hill
Columbia: Brad Muller & Dr. Megan Buning
Tempe: Tiffany Greene & Amanda Scarborough
Seattle: Eric Collins & Michele Smith
Tuscaloosa: Melissa Lee & Leigh Dakich
Fayetteville: Eric Frede & Jennie Ritter
Norman: Pam Ward & Carol Bruggeman
Super Regionals
Eugene: Mark Neely & Danielle Lawrie
Tempe: Courtney Lyle & Jenny Dalton-Hill
Seattle: Eric Frede & Jennie Ritter
Norman: Pam Ward & Carol Bruggeman
Women's College World Series
Adam Amin, Amanda Scarborough, & Laura Rutledge (afternoons, early Fri)
Beth Mowins, Jessica Mendoza (minus Sunday), Michele Smith, & Holly Rowe (evenings minus early Fri)

Regionals
Los Angeles: Trey Bender & Leah Amico
Tucson: Mark Neely & Danielle Lawrie
Baton Rouge: Lyn Rollins & Yvette Girouard
Tallahassee: Cara Capuano & Cheri Kempf
Athens: Alex Loeb & Megan Willis
Knoxville: Alex Perlman & Francesca Enea
College Station: Tyler Denning & Amanda Freed
Gainesville: Kevin Brown & Erin Miller
Super Regionals
Los Angeles: Beth Mowins, Jessica Mendoza, Michele Smith, & Holly Rowe
Tallahassee: Kevin Brown & Erin Miller
Athens: Alex Loeb & Megan Willis
Gainesville: Tiffany Greene & Amanda Scarborough
Women's College World Series Finals
Beth Mowins, Jessica Mendoza, Michele Smith, & Holly Rowe (tv)
Adam Amin, Amanda Scarborough, Kayla Braud, & Laura Rutledge (ESPN3 Second Screen Experience)

References

NCAA Division I softball tournament
Tournament